Bosnia and Herzegovina made their début at the Eurovision Song Contest 1993 in Millstreet, Ireland. Fazla represented Bosnia and Herzegovina with the song "Sva bol svijeta". The lyrics of the song describe the Bosnian War occurring at that time in Bosnia and Herzegovina, which gripped the entire country at the time. They finished in 16th place with 27 points.

Background

Bosnia and Herzegovina first entered the Eurovision Song Contest in 1993, having previously competed as a part of Yugoslavia from 1961 to 1991.

During the disintegration of Yugoslavia, the state broadcaster at the time, JRT, decided to continue Yugoslavia's participation in the contest, holding one last national final for the 1992 contest, held on 28 March 1992. Only artists from the republics of Serbia, Montenegro and Bosnia and Herzegovina competed, despite the latter declaring independence on 1 March. Artists from Croatia, Slovenia and Macedonia did not compete after declaring independence from Yugoslavia in 1991. The winning song was "Ljubim te pesmama" by Extra Nena, representing Serbia. However, by the time Extra Nena competed at Eurovision for Yugoslavia, the Socialist Federal Republic of Yugoslavia was no more, and a new republic, the Federal Republic of Yugoslavia, had been formed.

After the 1992 contest, Bosnia and Herzegovina's former sub-national broadcaster RTV Sarajevo became the country's national broadcaster, renamed Radio-Televizija Bosne i Hercegovine (RTVBiH). The broadcaster became a member of the European Broadcasting Union (EBU) on 1 January 1993, allowing it to compete in the Eurovision Song Contest for the first time as an independent nation.

Before Eurovision

BH Eurosong 1993 
RTVBiH decided to hold a national final to select the first entry from an independent Bosnia and Herzegovina. BH Eurosong 1993 was held in the RTVBiH TV studios in Sarajevo on 28 February 1993, hosted by Ismeta Krvavac, who had previously represented Bosnia and Herzegovina at the 1976, representing Yugoslavia, as the lead singer of the group Ambasadori. 11 songs competed to be the first entry for the independent country, however the group Nina, who competed with "Zapleši", were unable to get to the studio, and so a video-clip of their song was presented instead. Only the winner of the contest was announced, with an expert jury selecting the winner.

The winner was Fazla with the song "Sva bol svijeta". Alma Čardžić was rumoured to have come second with "Svi na ulice", however this was never confirmed.

At Kvalifikacija za Millstreet 
With the dissolution of the Soviet Union and the breakup of Yugoslavia, many newly independent countries that were formed became interested in competing in the Eurovision Song Contest. With this large influx of countries, the European Broadcasting Union (EBU) were forced to create a new measure to counter overcrowding in the contest. For the 1993 contest, the EBU decided to hold a one-off contest to select three countries to join the twenty-two countries already competing in the Eurovision Song Contest.

The Kvalifikacija za Millstreet (Qualification for Millstreet) contest was held in Ljubljana, Slovenia on 3 April at the TV studios of Slovene broadcaster Radiotelevizija Slovenija (RTV SLO). Seven countries in total competed, including Bosnia and Herzegovina, for a place in the final on 15 May 1993. Fazla performed first, preceding Croatia. The band received 52 points, placing 2nd, qualifying to the Eurovision Song Contest final alongside Slovenia and Croatia.

Voting

At Eurovision 
Fazla performed 18th at the Eurovision Song Contest 1993 in Millstreet, Ireland, following Finland and preceding the United Kingdom. The group received 27 points, receiving the maximum 12 points from Turkey, placing 16th of the 25 competing countries.

Warm applause rang throughout the hall during the voting when the Bosnian votes were announced in the midst of the war in the country. Static in the telephone line was clearly heard as the point reader attempted to read the points, as the organizers had to use satellite connection to get a link since most of the telephone lines were down in the country during that time.

Voting

References

External links 
Bosnian National Final 1993

1993
Countries in the Eurovision Song Contest 1993
Eurovision